The Israel Defense Forces Emblem is the primary symbol representing the Israel Defense Forces (IDF). 

The center of the emblem contains a sword wrapped in an olive branch inside a Star of David, with a banner containing the words Israel Defense Forces underneath. The olive branch wrapped sword was the symbol of the Haganah, the prestatal paramilitary force which was the IDF's primary predecessor organization.

The sword in the emblem symbolizes combat, while the olive branch symbolizes the yearning for peace. The Star of David is an important symbol of the Jewish tradition, which represents the Jewish people and their history.

See also
 Israel Defense Forces insignia

References

Bibliology

Israel Defense Forces